The 1978 Hamilton Tiger-Cats season was the 21st season for the team in the Canadian Football League and their 29th overall. The Tiger-Cats finished in 3rd place in the Eastern Conference with a 5–10–1 record, but lost the Eastern Semi-Final to the Montreal Alouettes. 

In February 1978, the club was purchased by President and majority shareholder of Maple Leaf Gardens Limited, Harold Ballard. Mr. Ballard became the team president that year and would keep the strong tradition of pro football in that City. Rocky DiPietro was in his rookie season with the Ti-Cats. Ed George spent four seasons in the NFL before returning to the CFL in 1978 with the Hamilton Tiger-Cats. Through two seasons with the Tiger-Cats he played 34 games. Quarterback Jimmy Jones was in his final season with the Tiger-Cats and he finished his Tiger-Cats career with 861 career pass attempts, which was good enough to rank in the top ten.

Regular season

Season standings

Season schedule

Post-season

Awards and honours
Ben Zambiasi, Linebacker, CFL All-Stars Defense

References

Hamilton Tiger-cats Season, 1978
Hamilton Tiger-Cats seasons
1978 Canadian Football League season by team